Television Tonga 2 is a Tongan television channel operated by the Tonga Broadcasting Commission. It was launched on July 4, 2008. 

The channel's programmes will include sports, films, "other foreign programmes" and a six-hour programme from China Central Television.

See also
 Television Tonga
 Tonga Broadcasting Commission

References

Television stations in Tonga